iiyama is a brand name of . It produces liquid crystal display (LCD) monitors and LED display panels. It was previously an independent Japanese computer electronics company called  with its headquarters in Chiyoda-ku, Tokyo. Iiyama was founded in 1972 by Kazuro Katsuyama, named after the city of Iiyama in Nagano Prefecture, Japan. The company was bought in January 2006 by MCJ Corporation, which includes Mouse Computer Corporation. The headquarters of iiyama was moved to Europe in October 2008. The CEO since January 2006 has been Takeichi Shinji.

History

They started producing black and white TVs in 1976 and color TVs in 1979, followed by computer monitors under its own brand name in 1981 which then became its main product range.

The company expanded to the western market in 1987 and in the 1990s opened up offices in Philadelphia, Germany, Poland, France, UK, Sweden, the Czech Republic, Taiwan, and its international head office in the Netherlands, where it is registered as Iiyama Benelux B.V. By 1993 it was the leading monitor supplier in Japan with a 21% market share. The first LCDs were released by iiyama in 1997.

In 2001 it merged with e-yama to create , and its headquarters moved to Nagano City. In October 2008 iiyama Corporation became part of Mouse Computer Co., Ltd., one of MCJ's companies.

See also
Iiyama Vision Master Pro series

References

External links
 

Computer companies established in 1972
Electronics companies established in 1972
Display technology companies
Electronics companies of Japan
Computer companies of Japan
Manufacturing companies based in Tokyo
Japanese brands
Iiyama
Japanese companies established in 1972